A railway stop, wayside stop or halt is an intermediate railway station with minimal facilities where passengers can board and exit the train.

While a junction or interlocking usually divides two or more lines or routes, and thus has remotely or locally operated signals, a wayside stop does not. Nor does it usually have any tracks other than the main track(s), and may or may not have switches (points, crossovers).

The exact definition depends on national legal and operational provisions, which is why, for example in Germany,  (railway stopping points) are usually classified as less important access points, which are often - but not necessarily - poorly accessible to passengers.

Germany 

There are exceptions, however, if it is locally connected to another service point. The important operational difference is that at a Haltepunkt only boarding and disembarking takes place (the train thus only stops), but at railway stations can be shunted or other trains can be awaited.

Definition according to EBO

Operational facilities
A  offers only one possibility to get on and off the trains. In contrast to a railway station, these can only stop there and in some cases also turn, but cannot overtake or cross each other.

A  consists of one or more platforms, which are arranged at the individual tracks of the open line with entrances and exits. In some areas, it can also be merely an unpaved access possibility instead of a platform.

Many of today's  used to be stations with overtaking and stabling tracks, which were then abandoned or dismantled. Typical examples are the former Hamburg Dammtor station or Gevelsberg Hauptbahnhof, both of which are only stops from an operational point of view.

Some stations - for example Mülheim (Ruhr) Hauptbahnhof - differ from a  only by a single pair of points.

There are usually no signals set up at a breakpoint. If the stopping point is not easily visible due to local conditions, a stopping point board is set up at a braking distance distance. However, if a platform is located between a pre-signal and a main signal ‒ usually a block signal ‒ the pre-signal at the end of the platform is repeated with a pre-signal repeater. In the case of a stop, the signals belonging to the branch can be positioned in the area of the stop.

Request stop
A special form of stopping point is the request stop. Trains only stop at these points when passengers actually want to board or alight. There are stop request buttons in the train which can be activated in good time by passengers who want to get off at the demand stop.

Some demand stop points have a switch on the platform with which passengers who want to board can signal the approaching train that they need to do so at an early stage.

On many lines, however, there are no special technical signalling devices on the platform. There it is necessary for passengers to be aware of the approaching train so that it stops.

When even the smallest stations were still staffed, passengers who wanted to board a train had to report to the station supervisor and passengers who were getting off had to inform the conductor or train driver of their wish at least one station in advance.

References

Railway stations by type